Nickelodeon is the Serbian version of Nick, launched on April 28, 2013 along with the Slovenian-language version of Nick. It broadcasts in Serbia, North Macedonia, Bosnia and Herzegovina and Montenegro. All animated and live-action shows are dubbed into the Serbian. Dubs are made by Gold Digi Net studio, but the channel also airs some dubs made by B92, Happy TV, Ideogram and Loudworks. The channel broadcasts 24/7. The Serbian version of channel is served by the Pan-European version of Nick.

Programming

Current

Current Nick Jr. Programming

Former Nick Jr. Programming

Former

References

External links

Serbia
Television channels and stations established in 2013
2013 establishments in Serbia
Television stations in Serbia
Serbian-language television stations
Television channels in North Macedonia
Children's television channels in North Macedonia
Television stations in Bosnia and Herzegovina